The Beast is a 2019 South Korean crime thriller film directed by Lee Jung-ho, starring Lee Sung-min, Yoo Jae-Myung, Jeon Hye-jin, and Choi Daniel. The story is about conflicts of two detective in solving a brutal murder case. The film is a remake of the French film, 36 Quai des Orfèvres (2004).

Plot 
Two detectives in conflict have to team up to solve a gruesome murder. After the mutilated body of a missing girl is discovered in the tidelands of Incheon, Han-soo (Lee Sung-min) and Min-tae (Yoo Jae-myung), who have been rivals for years, are now in charge of finding the culprit. The case seems like it will find a quick resolution with a suspect in custody, but things take a dark turn when Han-soo meets an informant who insists that he knows who the murderer is. As cover-ups and secret deals ensue, tension rise between the two detectives as the pressure of solving a crime is shaking up the Korean Peninsula comes to a head.

Cast

Production 
Principal photography began on November 5, 2018 and wrapped on February 12, 2019.

Release 
The Beast was released in South Korea on June 26, 2019.

International release 
Movie 'The Beast' has been pre-sold in 90 countries around the world including France, Germany, Austria, Switzerland, Netherlands, Belgium, Luxembourg, Bosnia, Croatia, Slovenia, Europe, Russia, Kazakhstan, Uzbekistan, Japan, Singapore, Taiwan, Thailand. , Malaysia, Indonesia and other countries in Asia.

References

External links 
 The Beast at Korean Film Council
 
 

2019 films
2010s Korean-language films
2019 crime thriller films
South Korean crime thriller films
2010s South Korean films